Continuous functions are of utmost importance in mathematics, functions and applications. However, not all functions are continuous. If a function is not continuous at a point in its domain, one says that it has a discontinuity there. The set of all points of discontinuity of a function may be a discrete set, a dense set, or even the entire domain of the function. This article describes the classification of discontinuities in the simplest case of functions of a single real variable taking real values.

The oscillation of a function at a point quantifies these discontinuities as follows:
 in a removable discontinuity, the distance that the value of the function is off by is the oscillation;
 in a jump discontinuity, the size of the jump is the oscillation (assuming that the value at the point lies between these limits of the two sides);
 in an essential discontinuity, oscillation measures the failure of a limit to exist; the limit is constant.
A special case is if the function diverges to infinity or minus infinity, in which case the oscillation is not defined (in the extended real numbers, this is a removable discontinuity).

Classification 

Removable discontinuity 

Consider the piecewise function 

The point  is a removable discontinuity. For this kind of discontinuity:

The one-sided limit from the negative direction:

and the one-sided limit from the positive direction:

is continuous at 

The term removable discontinuity is sometimes broadened to include a removable singularity, in which the limits in both directions exist and are equal, while the function is undefined at the point  This use is an abuse of terminology because continuity and discontinuity of a function are concepts defined only for points in the function's domain.

Jump discontinuity 

Consider the function

In this case, a single limit does not exist because the one-sided limits,  and  exist and are finite, but are not equal: since,  the limit  does not exist. Then,  is called a jump discontinuity, step discontinuity, or discontinuity of the first kind. For this type of discontinuity, the function  may have any value at

Essential discontinuity 

(Notice that one or both one-sided limits can be ). 

Consider the function

So  is an essential discontinuity, infinite discontinuity, or discontinuity of the second kind. (This is distinct from an essential singularity, which is often used when studying functions of complex variables).

Counting discontinuities of a function 

The two following properties of the set  are relevant in the literature.

The set of points at which a function is continuous is always a  set (see). 

 If on the interval   is monotone then  is at most countable and  This is Froda's theorem.
Tom Apostol follows partially the classification above by considering only removal and jump discontinuities. His objective is to study the discontinuities of monotone functions, mainly to prove Froda’s theorem. With the same purpose, Walter Rudin and Karl R. Stromberg study also removal and jump discontinuities by using different terminologies. However, furtherly, both authors state that  is always a countable set (see).

The term essential discontinuity seems to have been introduced by John Klippert. Furtherly he also classified essential discontinuities themselves by subdividing the set  into the three following sets:

Of course  Whenever   is called an essential discontinuity of first kind. Any  is said an essential discontinuity of second kind. Hence he enlarges the set  without losing its characteristic of being countable, by stating the following:

 The set  is countable.

Rewriting Lebesgue's Theorem 

In this theorem seems that all type of discontinuities have the same weight on the obstruction that a bounded function  be Riemann integrable on  Since countable sets are sets of Lebesgue's measure zero and a countable union of sets with Lebesgue's measure zero is still a set of Lebesgue's mesure zero, we are seeing now that this is not the case. In fact, the discontinuities in the set  are absolutly neutral in the regard of the Riemann integrability of  The main discontinuities for that purpose are the essential discontinuities of first kind and consequently the Lebesgue-Vitali theorem can be rewritten as follows:

 A bounded function,  is Riemann integrable on  if and only if the correspondent set  of all essential discontinuities of first kind of  has Lebesgue's measure zero.

The case where  correspond to the following well-known classical complementary situations of Riemann integrability of a bounded function :

 If  has left-hand limit at each point of  then  is Riemann integrable on 
 If  is a regulated function on  then  is Riemann integrable on

Examples 

Thomae's function is discontinuous at every non-zero rational point, but continuous at every irrational point. One easily sees that those discontinuities are all essential of the first kind, that is  By the first paragraph, there does not exist a function that is continuous at every rational point, but discontinuous at every irrational point.

The indicator function of the rationals, also known as the Dirichlet function, is discontinuous everywhere. These discontinuities are all essential of the first kind too.

Consider now the ternary Cantor set  and its indicator (or characteristic) function
 
One way to construct the Cantor set  is given by  where the sets  are obtained by recurrence according to 

In view of the discontinuities of the function  let's assume a point 

Therefore  only assumes the value zero in some neighbourhood of  Hence  is continuous at 

Discontinuities of derivatives 
That is,  for every .

It is well-known that according to Darboux's Theorem the derivative function  has the restriction of satisfying the intermediate value property.

 can of course be continuous on the interval . Recall that any continuous function, by Bolzano's Theorem, satisfies the intermediate value property.

On the other hand, the intermediate value property does not prevent  from having discontinuities on the interval . But Darboux's Theorem has an immediate consequence on the type of discontinuities that  can have.

This means in particular that the following two situations cannot occur:

Furtherly, two other situations have to be excluded (see John Klippert):

Observe that whenever one of the conditions (i), (ii), (iii), or (iv) is fulfilled for some  one can conclude that  fails to possess an antiderivative, on the interval .

On the other hand, a new type of discontinuity with respect to any function  can be introduced: an essential discontinuity, of the function , is said to be a fundamental essential discontinuity of  if

 and 

 and

See also

Notes

References

Sources

External links 

 
 "Discontinuity" by Ed Pegg, Jr., The Wolfram Demonstrations Project, 2007.
 
 

Theory of continuous functions
Mathematical analysis
Mathematical classification systems